Timothy A. Guden is a former United States Army soldier. Over a 33-year career, he served as the Command Sergeant Major for the United States Army Infantry School at Fort Benning, Georgia, from August 2012 to March 2014, the Command Sergeant Major of the Maneuver Center of Excellence and Fort Benning, Georgia, from March 2014 to May 2015, the Command Sergeant Major of the Joint Force Headquarters-National Capital Region from June 2015 to July 2016, Command Sergeant Major of the United States Military Academy at West Point, New York, from August 2016 to June 2018, and the Command Sergeant Major of the United States Army Training and Doctrine Command from February 2018 to September 2020. Guden retired from the Army on September 3, 2020.

Military career
Born in Medford, Wisconsin, Guden enlisted in the United States Army on July 28, 1987. He completed Basic Combat Training at Fort Jackson (South Carolina), and subsequently Advanced Individual Training at Fort Gordon, Georgia. Throughout his career, he has held numerous leadership positions ranging from team leader to brigade command sergeant major in Signal, Cavalry, Aviation, Intelligence, Armor and Infantry units. He served as the brigade operations sergeant major for the 1st Armored Brigade Combat Team, 4th Infantry Division; the battalion command sergeant major for 1st Battalion, 22nd Infantry Regiment; and the command sergeant major for the 2nd Battalion, 508th Parachute Infantry Regiment. Guden then served as the brigade command sergeant major for the 2nd Infantry Brigade Combat Team, 82nd Airborne Division.

His combat deployments include four tours in Iraq, one tour in Afghanistan, and one tour in the Persian Gulf during Operations Desert Shield/Desert Storm.

Personal life
Guden is married to his wife, Anne Guden, both of whom live together in North Carolina, post his retirement. They have one son, Jared Guden, who is currently serving in the United States Army. They also have another son named Jacob Alexander and two daughters, named Michaela Anne, and Elizabeth Anne. Honorary members of this specific Guden clan include adoptive daughter Anna Jean Hardy.

Awards and decorations
Guden has received the following awards:

References

United States Army personnel of the Gulf War
United States Army personnel of the Iraq War
United States Army personnel of the War in Afghanistan (2001–2021)
Living people
Recipients of the Distinguished Service Medal (US Army)
Recipients of the Legion of Merit
Year of birth missing (living people)
United States Army soldiers